The World Triathlon Cross Championships is a triathlon championship competition organised by World Triathlon. The competition has been held annually since 2011. Unlike normal triathlon races the cross triathlon (or X-tri) discipline is off road over difficult terrain. The championship typically involves a 1km swim, 20–30km mountain bike and 6–10km trail run.

Venues

Medallists

Men's championship

Women's championship

Medal table

References

 
 

Triathlon, Cross
Recurring sporting events established in 2011
Triathlon world championships